Smokie Norful Live is a live album from Contemporary Gospel singer Smokie Norful. The album was released on April 7, 2009, through EMI Gospel.

Track listing
 "He's Gonna Come Through" (feat. Tye Tribbett) - 4:56
 "I Will Bless The Lord" - 6:07
 "Justified" - 8:43
 "Mighty God" - 6:10
 "In The Presence Of The King" - 7:02
 "Dear God" - 5:37
 "No One Else" - 6:12
 "Jesus Is Love" (feat. Heather Headley) -	6:41
 "Don't Quit" - 7:07
 "I've Been Delivered" - 6:30

Awards
At the 41st GMA Dove Awards, the album was nominated to a Dove Award for Contemporary Gospel Album of the Year. The songs "Justified" and "Dear God" were also nominated to Dove Awards for Traditional Gospel and Contemporary Gospel Recorded Song of the Year respectively. "Justified" ended up winning its Dove Award. The album was also nominated for a Grammy Award for Best Contemporary R&B Gospel Album at the 52nd Grammy Awards.

Chart performance
The album peaked at #55 on Billboard 200, #5 on Billboard's R&B/Hip-Hop Albums, and #1 on Billboard's Gospel Albums. It stayed 38 weeks on the R&B/Hip-Hop charts and 66 weeks on the Gospel charts.

Charts

Weekly charts

Year-end charts

References

External links
Smokie Norful Live in Amazon.com

2009 live albums
Smokie Norful albums